Bomet County is a county in the former Rift Valley Province of Kenya. Initially a district, Bomet District was created from the former Kericho District  in 1992. The capital of Bomet County is Bomet.

Local authorities

Administrative and political units 
Bomet county has five sub-county administrative units with 25 county assembly wards and 66 locations.

Leadership

County government 
Bomet has had three governors since devolution, Isaac Ruto was the first Governor and was replaced by Joyce Laboso who died of cancer while in office. Dr. Hillary Barchok, being the deputy, was sworn in as the third governor on 8 August 2019. Linet Chepkorir Toto is the current women representative and Lawyer Hillary Sigei is currently serving as a Senator. http://www.parliament.go.ke/the-senate/sen-wakili-hillary-kiprotich-sigei
The county ward assemblies are run by members of county assemblies.

Electoral constituencies
The county has five electoral constituencies:
Bomet Central Constituency
Bomet East Constituency
Chepalungu Constituency
Sotik Constituency
Konoin Constituency

Demographics 
Bomet has a population of 875,689 person with a population density of 346 persons per square km as per the 2019 census report, out of this 434,287 are females, 441,379 males and 23 intersex persons.

Services/Urbanisation
 Source: USAid Kenya

Secondary schools
Tenwek Boys High
Longisa Boys High School
Moi Siongiroi Girls High School
Kabungut Boys High
Ndaraweta Girls secondary School
Kaboson Girls School
Chepalungu Boys High School
Chebunyo Boys Secondary School
Chebunyo Girls Secondary School
Siwot Secondary School
Kiptobit Secondary School
Kaplong boys high school
kimuchul secondary school
Kaplong Girls Secondary school
Moi Minariet Boys Secondary School
Muiywek Secondary School
Gorgor Secondary School
Chebilat Boys' High School
 Kamung'ei Secondary School
 Kamureito Secondary School
 Ndanai Girls' HighSchool
 Solyot Secondary School
 Olbutyo Boys High School
 Olbobo Secondary School
 Mulot High school
Kakimirai High school
Lelkatet High School
Saseta Girls Secondary School
Simoti Secondary School
merigi secondary school
kaporuso secondary school
Sigowet Secondary School
Chemaner Secondary School
Sigor Boys High School
Kaboson Secondary School
Sugumerga Secondary School
Kipreres Secondary School
Toronik Secondary School
Plokyi Girls' secondary School

See also
Nakuru County
Narok County
Kericho County
Nyamira County
Tenwek Mission Hospital

References
 Bomet Senator http://www.parliament.go.ke/the-senate/sen-wakili-hillary-kiprotich-sigei

External links
https://web.archive.org/web/20130511002842/https://opendata.go.ke/facet/counties/Bomet
Kalenjin Online
Bomet County

 
Counties of Kenya